Jalan Gula (Perak state route A100) is a major road in Perak, Malaysia.

List of junctions

Gula